Ahmad Ghazanfarpour is an Iranian dentist and activist who served as a member of the parliament from 1980 to 1982. 

A former National Front activist, he ran for a seat under the banner of the Office for the Cooperation of the People with the President.

References

 

1942 births
Living people
Members of the 1st Islamic Consultative Assembly
National Front (Iran) student activists
Office for the Cooperation of the People with the President politicians